The 2005 Calabrian regional election took place on 3–4 April 2005.

Agazio Loiero (DL, The Union) was elected President of the Region by a landslide.

Results
Source: Ministry of the Interior

References

Elections in Calabria
2005 elections in Italy